Marcelo Alejandro Otero Larzábal (born 14 April 1971) is an Uruguayan retired footballer who played as a striker. He was nicknamed "Marujo" during his career, and is the younger brother of former midfielder Raul Otero.

Otero played in Uruguay for Rampla Juniors and Peñarol, in Italy for Vicenza, and in Spain for Sevilla. Whilst at Vicenza he won the 1996–97 Coppa Italia.

International career
Otero made his senior debut for the Uruguay national football team on 19 October 1994 in a friendly match against Peru (0–1 win) in the Estadio Nacional José Díaz in Lima, Peru. His older brother Raúl, a defender, also earned his first international cap in the same game. He was also part of the Uruguayan national side that won the Copa América 1995.

Career statistics

International

Honours

Club
Vicenza
Coppa Italia : 1996–97

International
Uruguay
Copa América: 1995

References

External links 
  
  Argentine Primera statistics

1971 births
Living people
Uruguayan footballers
Uruguay international footballers
1995 Copa América players
Rampla Juniors players
Peñarol players
L.R. Vicenza players
Sevilla FC players
Club Atlético Colón footballers
Centro Atlético Fénix players
Expatriate footballers in Argentina
Expatriate footballers in Italy
Expatriate footballers in Spain
Uruguayan expatriate footballers
Uruguayan expatriate sportspeople in Italy
Uruguayan Primera División players
Serie A players
La Liga players
Argentine Primera División players
Copa América-winning players
Association football forwards